First Lady of Madagascar (French: Première Dame du Madagascar) is the title attributed to the wife of the president of Madagascar. The country's current first lady is Voahangy Rajaonarimampianina, wife of President Hery Rajaonarimampianina, who had held the position since January 25, 2014. There has been no first gentlemen of Madagascar to date.

First ladies of Madagascar

References

External links

First Lady of the Republic of Madagascar (French)

Madagascar